Big Run is a tributary of West Branch Fishing Creek in Sullivan County, Pennsylvania, in the United States. The stream is somewhat acidic, with a pH that ranged from 4.02 to 4.65 during a study on the watershed of Fishing Creek. Wisconsinan Till, Boulder Colluvium, and bedrock consisting of sandstone and shale all occur in the vicinity of the stream.

Course
Big Run begins on a plateau in Davidson Township. It flows southeast and almost immediately leaves the plateau and begins descending steeply through a deep and narrow valley. After several tenths of a mile, the stream gradually turns south. A short distance further downstream, it crosses Fishing Creek Road and reaches its confluence with West Branch Fishing Creek.

Hydrology
Between June 2010 and April 2011, the water temperature of Big Run was measured four times during a study of the Fishing Creek watershed. The highest temperature,  occurred on June 18, 2010 and the second-highest temperature, occurred on November 13, 2010. The second-lowest temperature occurred,  on April 9, 2011. The lowest temperature, occurred on January 4, 2011.

Between June 2010 and April 2011, the specific conductivity of the waters of Big Run was measured four times during the study of the Fishing Creek watershed . The highest specific conductivity was 20 micro-siemens per centimeter. This value occurred on June 18, 2010. The lowest specific conductivity occurred on January 4, 2011. The value was 6 micro-siemens per centimeter. The specific conductivity was 15 micro-siemens per centimeter on November 13, 2010 and April 9, 2011.

The pH of Big Run was measured four times during the study of the Fishing Creek watershed between June 2010 and April 2011. The highest pH was 4.65 and it occurred on November 13, 2010. The second-highest pH was 4.37. This value occurred on June 18, 2010. The second-lowest was 4.13 and occurred on January 4, 2011. The lowest pH, 4.02, occurred on April 9, 2011.

Big Run is designated by the Pennsylvania Department of Environmental Protection for use for aquatic life. It attains the Pennsylvania Department of Environmental Protection's standards for this use.

Geography, geology, and watershed

In its lower reaches, Big Run is on a glacial till known as the Wisconsinan Till. This till is a diamict that is unstratified or poorly stratified. In part of the area where the stream is in the vicinity of Wisconsinan Till, the till is underlain by alternating layers of silt and clay. Boulder Colluvium occurs near the stream's headwaters. The majority of the surface is covered in boulders consisting of quartz, sandstone, or conglomerate. Bedrock consisting of sandstone and shale can be found in the vicinity of the stream, especially in its middle and upper reaches.

The stream is entirely within the United States Geological Survey quadrangle of Elk Grove.

History
Big Run was entered into the Geographic Names Information System on August 2, 1979. Its identifier in the Geographic Names Information System is 1169569.

See also
Painter Run, next tributary of West Branch Fishing Creek going downstream
Shingle Mill Run, next tributary of West Branch Fishing Creek going upstream

References

Rivers of Sullivan County, Pennsylvania
Tributaries of Fishing Creek (North Branch Susquehanna River)
Rivers of Pennsylvania